The Spear of Destiny: the occult power behind the spear which pierced the side of Christ is a best-selling 1972 occult book by the anthroposophist writer Trevor Ravenscroft (1921–1989) about the Holy Lance, published by Neville Armstrong's Neville Spearman Publishers. Ravenscroft claimed that the book was based on research "by using mystical meditation" and on the papers of the Austrian anthroposophist Walter Stein given to Ravenscroft by his widow. Ravenscroft originally claimed to have met Stein, but later only claimed contact through a medium with Walter Stein's spirit.

Court case
In 1979 Ravenscroft sued James Herbert for copyright infringement in Herbert's 1978 novel The Spear. The defendant declined to pay Ravenscroft damages and eventually removed the offending content.

Second book 
After Ravenscroft's death, Tim Wallace-Murphy published The Mark of the Beast: The Continuing Story of the Spear of Destiny, citing Ravenscroft as co-author in 1997.

References

External links

1972 non-fiction books
Anthroposophy
History books about the occult
Occultism in Nazism